Hulaco is an unincorporated community located in extreme southeastern Morgan County, Alabama, United States and is included in the Decatur Metropolitan Area, as well as the Huntsville-Decatur Combined Statistical Area. A post office operated under the name Hulaco from 1855 to 1904

References

Unincorporated communities in Alabama
Unincorporated communities in Morgan County, Alabama
Decatur metropolitan area, Alabama
Huntsville-Decatur, AL Combined Statistical Area